Ipronidazole is an antiprotozoal drug of the nitroimidazole class used in veterinary medicine.  It is used for the treatment of histomoniasis in turkeys and for swine dysentery.

References

Antiprotozoal agents
Nitroimidazoles
Isopropyl compounds